Marone is an Italian surname. Notable people with the surname include:

 Lou Marone, an American professional baseball player
 Pietro Marone, an Italian painter of the late-Renaissance periods
 Sergio Marone, a Brazilian actor

See also

 Marrone
 Marone (disambiguation)
 Marone Cinzano

Italian-language surnames